Thomas McCulloch (1868–unknown) was a Scottish footballer who played in the Football League for West Bromwich Albion.

References

1868 births
Date of death unknown
Scottish footballers
English Football League players
Association football defenders
Partick Thistle F.C. players
Rangers F.C. players
West Bromwich Albion F.C. players
FA Cup Final players